Jefferson County Radio is a network of seven low-power FM radio stations in Jefferson County, Montana, United States. Owned and operated by Jefferson County Disaster & Emergency Services, the stations air classic country music and emergency messages and public interest items for residents of the county.

Transmitters

Notes

References

Radio stations in Montana
Radio stations established in 2004
Low-power FM radio stations in Montana
2004 establishments in Montana
Jefferson County, Montana
Classic country radio stations in the United States